Pius Suh Awa (May 4, 1930 – February 9, 2014) was a Catholic bishop in Cameroon.

Ordained to the priesthood in 1961, Awa was appointed coadjutor bishop of the Roman Catholic Diocese of Buéa in 1971 and became diocesan bishop in 1973. He retired in 2006.

Notes

1930 births
2014 deaths
21st-century Roman Catholic bishops in Cameroon
20th-century Roman Catholic bishops in Cameroon
Roman Catholic bishops of Buéa